The Nations Cup tournament was played for the first time at Esher RFC, England, in August 2008. An Under-20 version also took place in Canada a month before.

This was the first of what is planned to be a regular tournament involving major Northern Hemisphere women's rugby nations. The first event was originally promoted as including England, USA, Canada, Wales and France - but by the time the match schedule was published only the first three nations had confirmed their participation. The U20 had similar withdrawals, being eventually limited to only Canada, England and Wales.

England dominated both tournaments, only being pushed close by the USA in the opening game of the senior tournament. The USA were unable to maintain this performance against Canada, however, losing their fourth successive international against their North American rivals (their worst run ever) to finish third overall. For Canada, despite the heavy defeat to England, runners-up spot confirmed their position in the top four of women's rugby.

Under 20 Nations Cup 2008 (Appleby College, Oakville, Canada)

Final table

Points scoring
4 points awarded for a win, 2 points for a draw, no points for a loss. 1 bonus point awarded for scoring four or more tries and 1 bonus point for losing by less than 7 points.

Results

Final

Nations Cup 2008 (Esher RFC, England)

Final table

Results

See also
Women's international rugby

External links
U20 Nations Cup website

2008
International women's rugby union competitions hosted by England
International women's rugby union competitions hosted by Canada
2008 rugby union tournaments for national teams
2007–08 in English rugby union
2007–08 in Welsh rugby union
2008 in Canadian rugby union
2008 in Canadian women's sports
2008 in women's rugby union
2008 in English women's sport
2008 in American women's sports
2008 in American rugby union